Hockey Club de Reims was an ice hockey team in Reims, France. The club existed from 1969-2002. They played in the Nationale B and Nationale C from their founding in 1969 until they were promoted to the Ligue Magnus in 1990. Reims participated in the top level of French hockey from 1990 until they folded in 2002, winning the league title in 2000 and 2002.

Achievements
Ligue Magnus champion (2) : 2000, 2002.

External links
Club profile on hockeyarenas.net

Ice hockey teams in France
1969 establishments in France
2002 disestablishments in France
Ice hockey clubs established in 1969
Ice hockey clubs disestablished in 2002